Zsófia Torma (26 September 1832 – 14 November 1899) was a Hungarian archaeologist, anthropologist and paleontologist.

Life and work 
Torma was born in Csicsókeresztúr, Beszterce-Naszód County, Austria-Hungary (today Cristeștii Ciceului, Bistrița-Năsăud County, Romania). After her parents died, she moved with her sister to Szászváros, now in Romania, where she began to study the snail farms she found in Hunedoara County.

She was mostly self-educated. In 1875, she was encouraged by Flóris Rómer, considered by some to be the father of Hungarian archeology, to begin her own excavations of the ancient settlement of Tordos, along the Mureş river. The symbols and scripts on clay objects she found during an excavation in Hunyad County became an archaeological sensation. She also found artifacts of the 6,000- to 7,000-year-old Tordos culture, some of which were covered with Vinca symbols. According to Gizella,Zsófia Torma was the first to discover the Neolithic culture of Tordos, drawing attention to the connection between the signs of Tordos and the Assyrian-Babylonian literacy, the penetration of Sumerian literature through Southeastern Europe. She worked in Tordos for twenty years, more than thirty years before the discovery of the carefully collected, extremely valuable finds and dissertations on them, as the Vinca-Tordos culture was only explored in 1908. Torma had severe financial problems caused by her self-funded excavations. She also struggled with archeologists in her own country, who "ridiculed and ignored her, as a woman and amateur in the field of archaeology, as well as her groundbreaking ideas and efforts." However, her finds and writings found acceptance among foreign researchers who engaged in long correspondences with her.

Her most well-known work, the Ethnographische Analogien, was published in Jena, Germany, in 1894.

Torma had an important role in the founding of the National Museum of Transylvanian History of Kolozsvár (present-day Cluj-Napoca). In her will, she left her collection of 10,387 archeological pieces to the Transylvanian National Museum's Museum of Medals and Antiquities.

On 24 May 1899, just a few months before her death, she became the first female to be named an honorary doctor at the Kolozsvári m. kir. Ferencz József Tudomány, what is today Babeș-Bolyai University.

Torma died in Szászváros (present-day Orăştie), on 14 November 1899.

See also
Timeline of women in science

References

Notes

 The life work of Zsófia Torma in the Transylvanian Values Collection

External links 
Coltofean, Laura. 2017. Zsófia Torma: A pioneer of prehistoric archaeology in nineteenth-century Transylvania. In: Cs. Szabó, V. Rusu-Bolindeț, G. T. Rustoiu, M. Gligor (eds.): Adalbert Cserni and His Contemporaries. The Pioneers of Alba Iulia and Beyond. Mega Publishing House, Cluj-Napoca, 2017: 327-354.
 Coltofean, Laura. 2015. Object Photography in 19th Century Archaeology. The Photographs of Zsófia Torma's Archaeological Collection. Brukenthal. Acta musei X.1: 35-48.
 Coltofean, Laura. 2015. Importanța ediției a opta a Congrès international dꞌanthropologie et dꞌarchéologie préhistoriques în dezvoltarea arheologiei preistorice în Transilvania secolului al XIX-lea / The Importance of CIAAP 1876 in the Development of Prehistoric Archaeology in 19th Century Transylvania. In: ArheoVest, Nr. III / No. III: In Memoriam Florin Medeleț (1943-2005), Interdisciplinaritate în Arheologie [Interdisciplinarity in Archaeology], Timişoara, 28 noiembrie 2015 / 28 November 2015, Vol. 2: Metode Interdisciplinare și Istorie [Interdisciplinary Methods and History]: 1035-1055. 
 Coltofean, Laura. 2014. Unveiling Zsófia Torma. The Diary of a Woman, an Archaeologist and a Visionary. In: Marler, Joan (ed.), Fifty Years of Tărtăria Excavations. Festschrift in Honor of Gheorghe Lazarovici on the Occasion of His 73rd Birthday. Sebastopol: 258-273.
 Coltofean, Laura. 2012. When Passion is Stronger than Death… Zsófia Torma’s Reflections. Brukenthalia. Romanian Cultural History Review 2: 67-77.

1832 births
1899 deaths
People from Bistrița-Năsăud County
Hungarian archaeologists
Hungarian anthropologists
Hungarian paleontologists
Hungarian women archaeologists
Women paleontologists
Hungarian women anthropologists
19th-century women scientists
19th-century Hungarian women writers